The Agustinas Ermitañas Convento Santa Úrsula is an Augustinian  convent located in the city of Toledo, in Castile-La Mancha, Spain. It was founded in 1259.

The church dates back to 1360 and retains some of the original Mudéjar architecture.
It has a reredos made in 1535 by Alonso Berruguete.

See also
 Convent of the Calced Augustinians, Toledo
 Convento de la Purísima Concepción, Toledo

References

External links

Convento de Santa Úrsula in toledo-turismo

13th-century establishments in Spain
Buildings and structures completed in 1360
Augustinian monasteries in Spain
Roman Catholic churches in Toledo, Spain
Convents in Spain
Bien de Interés Cultural landmarks in the City of Toledo
Mudéjar architecture in Castilla–La Mancha